Grigori Georgievich Denisenko (born 24 June 2000) is a Russian professional ice hockey winger currently playing for the Charlotte Checkers of the American Hockey League (AHL) as a prospect to the Florida Panthers of the National Hockey League (NHL). He was selected in the first round, 15th overall, by the Florida Panthers in the 2018 NHL Entry Draft. He played two seasons with Lokomotiv Yaroslavl of the Kontinental Hockey League before moving to North America in 2020, and made his NHL debut in 2021.

Playing career
Denisenko played as a youth within the junior ranks of Lokomotiv Yaroslavl. He made his professional debut in the Kontinental Hockey League with Lokomotiv during the 2017–18 playoffs, featuring in 4 post-season games before returning to help junior affiliate Loko capture the Junior Hockey Championship.

As the 7th ranked international skater by the NHL Central Scouting, Denisenko was selected at the 2018 NHL Entry Draft in the first round, 15th overall, by the Florida Panthers on 23 June 2018.

On 5 May, 2020, Denisenko agreed to terms on a three-year, entry-level contract with the Florida Panthers. He officially signed his contract on 15 July 2020. He began the 2020–21 season playing in the American Hockey League with the Syracuse Crunch, and made his NHL debut on 6 March 2021 against the Nashville Predators.

International play

 

 
 

Denisenko was selected to the Russian team for the 2019 World Junior Championships in Vancouver, Canada. Denisenko was the tournament scoring leader, recording four goals and nine points in seven games to help Russia claim the Bronze medal.

Career statistics

Regular season and playoffs

International

Awards and honors

References

External links
 

2000 births
Living people
Charlotte Checkers (2010–) players
Florida Panthers draft picks
Florida Panthers players
Ice hockey players at the 2016 Winter Youth Olympics
HC Lada Togliatti players
Lokomotiv Yaroslavl players
National Hockey League first-round draft picks
Russian ice hockey left wingers
Sportspeople from Novosibirsk
Syracuse Crunch players